Park Chul-Woo (born September 29, 1965) is a retired football player and goalkeeper coach.

He played in K-League side POSCO Atoms, LG Cheetahs, Chunnam Dragons and Suwon Samsung Bluewings in South Korea.

Club career statistics

International clean sheets
Results list South Korea's goal tally first.

External links

 

1965 births
Living people
Association football goalkeepers
South Korean footballers
South Korea international footballers
Pohang Steelers players
FC Seoul players
Jeonnam Dragons players
Suwon Samsung Bluewings players
K League 1 players
1994 FIFA World Cup players